This is a list of some notable former pupils of The King's School, Canterbury, known as Old King's Scholars (abbreviated as OKS.) The term King's Scholar referred to the few boys who, by their academic ability at a very young age, won scholarships to King's.

Art 
Shoo Rayner (born 1956), children's author and illustrator
Edmund de Waal  (born 1964), artist, potter, and author

Business 
Ian Cheshire (born 1959), chairman of Barclays UK and former CEO of Kingfisher plc
Charles Powell  (born 1941), diplomat, businessman, and foreign policy adviser to Margaret Thatcher
Hugh Robertson  (born 1962), chairman of the British Olympic Association and the Camelot Group, former MP for Faversham and Mid Kent, Minister of State, and Minister for Sport

Engineering, science and medicine 
Roger C. Field (born 1945), inventor
Michael Foale  (born 1957), astrophysicist and former NASA astronaut
William Harvey (1578–1657), physician
Sir Tony Hoare  (born 1934), computer scientist
Thomas Linacre (–1524), humanist scholar and physician
Thomas Stapleton (1920-2007), paediatrician
John Tradescant the Younger (1608–1662), botanist and gardener

Film, television and theatre 
Oz Clarke  (born 1949), wine writer and television presenter and broadcaster
Charles Frend (1909–1977), film director and editor
David Gower  (born 1957), cricket commentator, former cricketer and captain of the England cricket team
John Lloyd  (born 1951), television and radio comedy writer and producer
Leslie Mitchell (1905–1985), British radio and television announcer
Michael Powell (1905–1990), filmmaker
Carol Reed (1906–1976), film director
Tom Ward (born 1971), film, stage and television actor
Antony Worrall Thompson (born 1951), restaurateur, celebrity chef, television presenter and radio broadcaster

History and philosophy 
Catherine Conybeare (born 1966), academic and philologist
Hugh Honour (1927–2016), art historian
Jeremy Lawrance  (born 1952), linguist and historian
Thomas Linacre (–1524), humanist scholar and physician
Walter Pater (1839–1894), essayist, literary and art critic, fiction writer and humanist
George Sale, (1697–1736), Orientalist scholar and solicitor
Alan Watts (1915–1973), writer and philosopher
William Wyse (1860–1929), classical scholar

Literature 
Sebastian Barker  (1945–2014), poet
Richard Boys (1785–1867), Anglican clergyman, chaplain on St. Helena and author
Oz Clarke  (born 1949), wine writer and television presenter and broadcaster
Michael Cordy, novelist
David Edwards  (1929–2018), former Dean of Norwich, Speaker's Chaplain, Sub-Dean at Westminster Abbey, Dean of Southwark and author
Sir Patrick Leigh Fermor  (1915–2011), author, scholar and soldier
James Hamilton-Paterson (born 1941), poet and novelist
John Wesley Harding (born 1965), singer-songwriter and author
Dyneley Hussey (1893–1972), war poet, journalist and critic
Alaric Jacob (1909–1995), writer, journalist and war correspondent
John Lloyd  (born 1951), television and radio comedy writer and producer
Edward Lucie-Smith (born 1933), writer, poet, art critic and curator
Christopher Marlowe (1565–1593), playwright and poet
Somerset Maugham  (1874–1965), playwright, novelist and short story writer
Michael Morpurgo  (born 1943), author, poet, playwright and librettist
Walter Pater (1839–1894), essayist, literary and art critic, fiction writer and humanist
Anthony Price (1928–2019), author
Shoo Rayner (born 1956), children's author and illustrator
Edmund de Waal  (born 1964), artist, potter and author
Hugh Walpole  (1884–1941), novelist
Alan Watts (1915–1973), writer and philosopher

Military 
John Day  (born 1947), former Royal Air Force commander and military advisor to BAE Systems
Sir Patrick Leigh Fermor  (1915–2011), author, scholar and soldier
Arthur Fleming-Sandes  (1894–1961), British Army major and Victoria Cross recipient during World War I
Harry Gardner  (1890–1939), British Army first-class cricketer and officer
Bernard Montgomery  (1887–1976), British Army field marshal
Peter Scawen Watkinson Roberts  (1917–1979), Royal Navy Lieutenant Commander and Victoria Cross recipient during World War II
William Vousden  (1848–1902), British Indian Army major general and Victoria Cross recipient during the Second Anglo-Afghan War

Music 
Stephen Barlow (born 1954), conductor and former Artistic Director of the Buxton Festival
Simon Carrington (born 1942), conductor, musician, and former founding member of The King's Singers
Harry Christophers  (born 1953), conductor
John Wesley Harding (born 1965), singer-songwriter and author
William Lewarne Harris (1929-2013), composer and teacher
Andrew Marriner (born 1954), former principal clarinettist of the London Symphony Orchestra
George Miles  (1913–1988), organist
Christopher Seaman (born 1942), conductor
Stephen Varcoe (born 1949), classical singer

Politics 
Charles Abbott, 1st Baron Tenterden  (1762–1832), barrister and judge
Natascha Engel (born 1967), former MP for North East Derbyshire
Catherine Fall, Baroness Fall, political advisor and former Downing Street Chief of Staff under David Cameron
Tristan Garel-Jones  (1941–2020), former MP for Watford
George Gipps (1790–1847), Governor of New South Wales
Sir Fairfax Luxmoore (1876–1944), barrister and judge who sat as Lord Justice of Appeal
Sir Anthony Parsons  (1922–1996), diplomat, former British ambassador to Iran, and former British Permanent Representative to the UN
Charles Powell  (born 1941), diplomat, businessman, and foreign policy adviser to Margaret Thatcher
Jonathan Powell (born 1956), diplomat and former Downing Street Chief of Staff under Tony Blair
Hugh Robertson  (born 1962), chairman of the British Olympic Association and the Camelot Group, former MP for Faversham and Mid Kent, Minister of State, and Minister for Sport 
Sir Patrick Walker  (born 1932), former Director General of MI5

Religion 
Gavin Ashenden (born 1954), former Anglican priest and continuing Anglican bishop
Richard Boys (1785–1867), Anglican clergyman, chaplain on St. Helena, and author
William Broughton (1788–1853), Anglican Bishop of Australia
David Edwards  (1929–2018), former Dean of Norwich, Speaker's Chaplain, Sub-Dean at Westminster Abbey, Dean of Southwark, and author
Reginald Glennie, first-class cricketer and clergyman
Michael Mayne  (1929–2006), former Dean of Westminster
Howard Mowll (1890–1958), former Anglican Archbishop of Sydney

Sport 
 Harry Gardner  (1890–1939), first-class cricketer and British Army officer
 Reginald Glennie (1864–1953), first-class cricketer and clergyman
 David Gower  (born 1957), cricket commentator, former cricketer and captain of the England cricket team
 Bob Haines (1906–1965), cricketer
 Frances Houghton  (born 1980), Olympic rower and World Champion
 Millie Knight (born 1999), Paralympic skier
 Tom Ransley  (born 1985), former Olympic rower and World Champion
 Ollie Robinson (born 1993), England cricketer
 Fred Scarlett (born 1975), Olympic rower

Other 
Gregory Blaxland (1778–1853), pioneer settler, explorer, and co-leader of the first crossing of the Blue Mountains
John Blaxland (1769–1845), pioneer settler and explorer
Hubert Chesshyre  (1940–2020), retired British officer of arms found to have committed child sexual abuse
Myles Jackman, (born 1974/75), lawyer
Jacquetta Wheeler (born 1981), model
Peter, Hereditary Prince of Yugoslavia (born 1980)

References

 
King's
Old King's Scholars